The 1947–48 season was FC Steaua București's 1st season since its founding in 1947.

The club was founded as ASA București (Asociația Sportivă a Armatei București – Army Sports Association).

Divizia A

League table

League results summary 

- Note: At that time there were 2 points per win, giving a total of 22 pts.

Results 

Source:

Cupa României

Results

See also

 1947–48 Cupa României
 1947–48 Divizia A

Notes and references

External links
 1947-48 FC Steaua București matches

FC Steaua București seasons
1947–48 in Romanian football
Steaua, București
Steaua